Daystar Academy is a private international bilingual school in Chaoyang District, Beijing. Providing instruction in both Chinese and English, it has over 850 students represented by 20 nationalities from kindergarten to grade 12. It has three campuses, the main campus is on Shunbai Road and the other two campuses offering nursery and elementary grades are in Sanlitun and Quanfa.

Overview
Established in 2002, Daystar Academy is a bilingual school with instruction in Chinese and English and follows a Montessori program. It is part of Ivy Education. Students are from 20 countries such as Canada, China, France, the United Kingdom, and the United States. The school has three campuses in the Chaoyang District of Beijing. Its Beigao campus serves students from kindergarten to grade 12, its Sanlitun campus serves students from grades one through five, and its Quanfa campus serves students who are younger than six years old. In 2020, the school had over 850 students. The school offers a music program and hosts a "Daystar's Got Talent" event.

Students are enrolled in the following programs:
Kindergarten Montessori program for children 3–5 years of age
Elementary School (Chinese National Curriculum and IB PYP curriculum)
Middle School (Chinese National Curriculum and IB MYP curriculum)
High School (Starting Fall 2018, IB DP curriculum)

References

External links
 Official website

2002 establishments in China
Bilingual schools
Educational institutions established in 2002
Education in Beijing
International schools in Beijing
International Baccalaureate schools in China
Private schools in China
Schools in Chaoyang District, Beijing